Safra Ada Catz (born December 1, 1961) is an American billionaire banker and technology executive. She is the CEO of Oracle Corporation. She has been an executive at Oracle  since April 1999, and a board member since 2001. In April 2011, she was named co-president and chief financial officer (CFO), reporting to founder Larry Ellison. In September 2014, Oracle announced that Ellison would step down as CEO and that Mark Hurd and Catz had been named as joint CEOs. In September 2019, Catz became the sole CEO after Hurd resigned due to health issues.

Early life 
Catz was born in Holon, Israel, to Jewish parents. Her father was an immigrant from Romania. She moved from Israel to Brookline, Massachusetts at the age of six.

Catz graduated from Brookline High School. She earned a bachelor's degree from the Wharton School of the University of Pennsylvania in 1983 and a J.D. from the University of Pennsylvania Law School in 1986.

Career 
Catz was a banker at Donaldson, Lufkin & Jenrette, serving as a managing director from February 1997 to March 1999 and a senior vice president from January 1994 to February 1997 and previously held various investment banking positions since 1986. In 1999, Catz joined Oracle as senior vice president. She has been a non-executive director of Oracle subsidiary Hyperion Solutions since April 2007. She has been a member of the executive council of TechNet since March 2013. She was a director of PeopleSoft Inc since December 2004 and Stellent Inc. since December 2006.

Catz joined Oracle Corporation in April 1999.  Catz became a member of the company's board of directors in October 2001 and president in early 2004.  She is credited for having driven Oracle's 2005 efforts to acquire software rival PeopleSoft in a $10.3 billion takeover. Catz is also the company's CFO, serving temporarily in that role from November 2005 to September 2008, and from April 2011 to the present.  Mark Hurd joined her as co-president in 2010. In December 2019, Oracle stated that Catz would be the sole CEO after Hurd's death.

In 2009 she was ranked by Fortune as the 12th most powerful woman in business. In 2009 she was ranked by Forbes as the 16th most powerful businesswoman. In 2014, she was ranked 24th. According to an Equilar analysis published by Fortune, she was in 2011 the highest-paid woman among Fortune 1000 companies, receiving an estimated US$51,695,742 in total remuneration.

Catz is a lecturer in accounting at the Stanford Graduate School of Business. Catz was a director of HSBC from 2008 to 2015.

After the election of Donald Trump, Catz was one of several high-profile CEOs, including Tim Cook, Sheryl Sandberg and Jeff Bezos, invited to talk with the then president-elect about potentially taking up a position in the incoming administration. According to Bloomberg, she was considered for the post of U.S. Trade Representative or Director of National Intelligence.

Catz is the highest paid female CEO of any U.S. company as of April 2017, earning $40.9 million after a 23% drop in her total compensation relative to 2016.

Catz was elected to the board of directors of The Walt Disney Company in December 2017, effective  February 2018.

In March 2021 Catz garnered attention for her stock trading, for acquiring 2.25 million shares through the conversion of derivatives, before selling them on the open market at roughly double the price.

Political involvement 

During the 2016 Republican presidential primaries, Catz donated to the campaign of Marco Rubio. She later served on President Trump's transition team, and media outlets frequently mentioned her as a potential official in the Trump administration. During the 2018 election cycle, Catz donated over $150,000 to Republican-aligned groups and individuals, including Congressman Devin Nunes. Catz donated $125,000 to Donald Trump's re-election campaign in May 2020.

Personal life 
Catz is married to Gal Tirosh and they have two sons.

References

External links 
Official biography
Topics

1961 births
20th-century American businesspeople
21st-century American businesspeople
American chief executives of Fortune 500 companies
American chief financial officers
American computer businesspeople
American corporate directors
American people of Romanian-Jewish descent
American technology chief executives
American women bankers
American bankers
American women chief executives
Brookline High School alumni
Businesspeople from Massachusetts
Directors of The Walt Disney Company
HSBC people
Israeli women chief executive officers
Israeli emigrants to the United States
Israeli Jews
Israeli people of Romanian-Jewish descent
Living people
Oracle employees
People from Brookline, Massachusetts
People from Holon
Stanford University Graduate School of Business faculty
University of Pennsylvania Law School alumni
Wharton School of the University of Pennsylvania alumni
Women chief financial officers
20th-century American businesswomen
21st-century American businesswomen